

This is a list of the National Register of Historic Places listings in Mitchell County, Kansas.

This is intended to be a complete list of the properties and districts on the National Register of Historic Places in Mitchell County, Kansas, United States.  The locations of National Register properties and districts for which the latitude and longitude coordinates are included below, may be seen in a map.

There are 13 properties and districts listed on the National Register in the county.

Current listings

|}

See also

 List of National Historic Landmarks in Kansas
 National Register of Historic Places listings in Kansas

References

Mitchell

Buildings and structures in Mitchell County, Kansas